In coordination chemistry, Tm is an abbreviation for anionic tridentate ligand based on three imidazole-2-thione groups bonded to a borohydride center. They are examples of scorpionate ligands.  Various ligands in this family are known, differing in what substituents are on the imidazoles. The most common is TmMe, which has a methyl group on the nitrogen. It is easily prepared by the reaction of molten methimazole (1-methylimidazole-2-thione) with sodium borohydride, giving the sodium salt of the ligand.  Salts of the TmMe anion are known also for lithium and potassium. Other alkyl- and aryl-group variations are likewise named TmR according to those groups.

Ligand characteristics, comparison with Tp−
The TmMe anion is a tridentate, tripodal ligand topologically similar to the more common Tp ligands, but the two classes of ligands differ in several ways.  TmMe has three "soft" sulfur donor atoms, whereas Tp− has three nitrogen donor atoms. The thioamide sulfur is highly basic, as found for other thioureas.  The TmR anion simulates the environment provided by three facial thiolate ligands but without the 3- charge of a facial trithiolate.

The large 8-membered SCNBNCSM chelate rings in M(TmMe) complexes are more flexible than the 6-membered CNBNCM rings in M(Tp) complexes.  This flexibility enables the formation of boron-metal bonds, after loss of the B-H bond.  This degradation of the coordinated TmMe anion gives a dehydrogenated boranamide B(mt)3 where mt = methimazolate.

References

Inorganic chemistry
Tripodal ligands